Harris Township is an inactive township in Ripley County, in the U.S. state of Missouri.

Harris Township was erected in 1871, taking its name Travis Harris, a state legislator.

References

Townships in Missouri
Townships in Ripley County, Missouri